Demopolis Regional Airport  is a city-owned, public-use airport located six nautical miles (7 mi, 11 km) southwest of the central business district of Demopolis, a city in Marengo County, Alabama, United States. It is also known as Demopolis Municipal Airport and Julian D. "Buzz" Sawyer Airport.

This airport is included in the FAA's National Plan of Integrated Airport Systems for 2011–2015 and 2009–2013, both of which categorized it as a general aviation facility.

This airport is assigned a three-letter location identifier of DYA by the Federal Aviation Administration, but it does not have an International Air Transport Association (IATA) airport code.

History
During World War II the airfield was built by the United States Army Air Forces and opened in October 1943 as Demopolis Army Airfield. The airfield was returned to civil control in 1946.

Facilities and aircraft 
The airport covers an area of 438 acres (177 ha) at an elevation of 112 feet (34 m) above mean sea level. It has one runway designated 4/22 with an asphalt surface measuring 5,002 by 100 feet (1,525 x 30 m).

For the 12-month period ending September 28, 2016, the airport had 5,250 aircraft operations, an average of 14 per day: 99% general aviation and 1% military. At that time there were 18 aircraft based at this airport: 16 single-engine and 2 multi-engine.

References

External links 
 Aerial image as of January 1993 from USGS The National Map
 

1943 establishments in Alabama
Airports established in 1943
Airports in Alabama
Transportation buildings and structures in Marengo County, Alabama